The Ninetology Pearl Mini (I5350) is an entry level smartphone powered by a Qualcomm Snapdragon (1.0 GHz) processor and runs on the Android Ginger Bread 2.3 Operating System, with dual SIM capabilities. The device is manufactured by Ninetology in collaboration with Qualcomm and Tune Talk.

The phone is offered sealed with a default SIM card from a Malaysian mobile virtual network operator(Tune Talk).

History

Release
The Ninetology Pearl Mini (I5350) was announced at a launch event themed 'Experiencing Differences with The Youth's Spirit,' during the month of April, 2013.

Feature

Hardware
The Ninetology Pearl Mini I5350 runs on a Qualcomm Snapdragon 1.0 GHz single core processor. It has a 3.5" inch HVGA capacitive display screen(196ppi pixel density) with a resolution of 320 X 480, capable of displaying up to 262K colors. Its dimensions are: 115.3 mm (H) X 62.0 mm (W) X 11.8 mm (T) and weighs 108 grams.

It possesses a 2.0 megapixel rear camera with a 4x zoom feature and a scene mode function.

The battery has a capacity of Li-Ion 1300mAh.

Additional storage is available via a MicroSD card socket, which is certified to support up to 32 GB of additional storage.

Software
The Ninetology Pearl Mini I5350 is running on the Android Gingerbread Operating System and is preloaded with a variety of applications:
 Web: Native Android Browser 
 Social: Facebook, YouTube
 Media: Camera, Gallery, FM Radio, Music Player, Video Player, 
 Personal Information Management: Calendar, Detail Contact Information
 Utilities: Calculator, Alarm Clock, Google Maps, AirAsia, Voice Recorder, Tune Talk

Reception
According to Business Times Malaysia, Ninetology had secured 25,000 units from dealers in less than 45 days since the launch date of the Pearl Mini.

References

External links
http://ninetology.com/malaysia/products_smartphones_pearlmini_details.html

Smartphones
Mobile phones introduced in 2013
Android (operating system) devices